James David "J.D." Greear (born May 1, 1973) is an evangelical American religious leader who is the pastor of The Summit Church in Durham, North Carolina. He served as the 62nd president of the Southern Baptist Convention from 2018 to 2021.

Early life and education
Greear was born in Winston-Salem, North Carolina. He graduated from Word of Life Bible Institute and earned a Bachelor of Arts degree from Campbell University.

He entered the PhD program at Southeastern Baptist Theological Seminary in 1999, graduating in 2003 with a doctorate in philosophy, concentrating primarily on Christian and Islamic theology. His dissertation was titled Theosis and Muslim Evangelism: How the Recovery of a Patristic Understanding of Salvation Can Aid Evangelical Missionaries in the Evangelization of Islamic Peoples.

Career 
On July 18, 1999, Greear was ordained at Salem Baptist Church, the church he grew up in. In 2002, he became the pastor of what was then Homestead Heights Baptist Church in Durham. Soon afterward, Greear relaunched the church as The Summit Church. Within three years, the church had grown to the point that it had to sell its old facility and move services to Riverside High School in Durham. He worked with the International Mission Board.

In 2018, he became the 62nd President of the Southern Baptist Convention and was re-elected by acclamation for a second one-year term in 2019 in an uncontested election. His term in office was extended to a third year when the 2020 annual meeting of the SBC was cancelled due to the COVID-19 pandemic and a successor could not be elected.

Greear has sought to minister to sex abuse victims and offenders in the local church that he pastors. According to him, the gospel message of Jesus, not national political purposes, must be the aim of Baptist churches.

References

External links 
Official website
The Summit Church website

1973 births
21st-century Calvinist and Reformed theologians
Baptists from North Carolina
Campbell University alumni
Living people
People from Winston-Salem, North Carolina
Southern Baptist Convention presidents
Southern Baptist ministers
21st-century American theologians
21st-century American clergy